Tab-separated values (TSV) is a simple, text-based file format for storing tabular data. Records are separated by newlines, and values within a record are separated by tab characters. The TSV format is thus a delimiter-separated values format, similar to comma-separated values.

TSV is a simple file format that is widely supported, so it is often used in data exchange to move tabular data between different computer programs that support the format. For example, a TSV file might be used to transfer information from a database to a spreadsheet.

Example 
The head of the Iris flower data set can be stored as a TSV using the following plain text (note that the HTML rendering may convert tabs to spaces):

Sepal length&Tab;Sepal width&Tab;Petal length&Tab;Petal width&Tab;Species
5.1&Tab;3.5&Tab;1.4&Tab;0.2&Tab;I. setosa
4.9&Tab;3.0&Tab;1.4&Tab;0.2&Tab;I. setosa
4.7&Tab;3.2&Tab;1.3&Tab;0.2&Tab;I. setosa
4.6&Tab;3.1&Tab;1.5&Tab;0.2&Tab;I. setosa
5.0&Tab;3.6&Tab;1.4&Tab;0.2&Tab;I. setosa

The TSV plain text above corresponds to the following tabular data:

Character escaping 
The IANA media type standard for TSV achieves simplicity by simply disallowing tabs within fields.

Since the values in the TSV format cannot contain literal tabs or newline characters, a convention is necessary for lossless conversion of text values with these characters.  A common convention is to perform the following escapes:

This can lead to ambiguities.

Another ambiguity is whether records are separated by a line feed, as is typical for Unix platfoms, or a carriage return and line feeds, as is typical for Microsoft platforms. Many programs such as LibreOffice expect a carriage return followed by a newline.

See also 
 Comma-separated values
 Delimiter collision

References

Bibliography 
 IANA, Text Media Types, Definition of tab-separated-values (tsv), Paul Lindner, U of MN Internet Gopher Team, June 1993
 Tab Separated Values (TSV): a format for tabular data exchange, Jukka Korpela, created 2000-09-01, last update 2005-02-12.

External links 
 Tab Separated Value File Format, Gnumeric manual

Spreadsheet file formats
Delimiter-separated format